The Phoenix Iron Works is a foundry in Oakland, California. Phoenix Iron Works has been a major supplier of manhole covers and street gutter gratings.

History
Phoenix Iron Works was founded in 1901 by William Russell in Oakland, California.

References

External links

Manufacturing companies based in Oakland, California
Foundries in the United States
1901 establishments in California
Manufacturing companies based in California